(There arose a war), 19, is a church cantata by Johann Sebastian Bach. He composed it in Leipzig in 1726 for the Feast of Saint Michael and first performed it on 29 September 1726. It is the second of his three extant cantatas for this feast.

History and words 
Bach took up his position in Leipzig in 1723. His first years in the city were particularly productive in terms of cantatas for the church calendar. 
As well as being a Christian festival, St. Michael's Day was important in the commercial life of Leipzig as it marked the start of one of the city's annual trade fairs.

The prescribed readings for the day were from the Book of Revelation, Michael fighting the dragon, and from the Gospel of Matthew, heaven belongs to the children, the angels see the face of God. The text of the cantata was written by Christian Friedrich Henrici, better known as Picander. By now a regular collaborator of the composer, Picander had provided the libretto for a previous St Michael's Day cantata. Picander includes as the closing chorale a stanza from a hymn by Christoph Demantius.

Bourgeois seems to have been influenced by the secular song "" contained in the  published around 1510.

Scoring and structure 
The piece is scored for three vocal soloists (soprano, tenor, and bass), four-part choir, and a Baroque instrumental ensemble of three trumpets, timpani, two oboes, oboe da caccia, two oboes d'amore, two violins, viola, and basso continuo. Traditionally in Leipzig during Bach's time the Feast of St Michael celebrations used the largest orchestra available. All known complete Bach cantatas for this occasion include trumpet and timpani.

It is in seven movements:

Music 
As with other Bach cantatas written for the Feast of St. Michael, this work opens with an "imposing" chorus. The opening and closing section of this da capo movement focuses on a single line of text describing the battle against the forces of evil. The middle section sets the remaining five lines of the text. The movement includes no instrumental introduction, creating an "immediate dramatic effect". Craig Smith suggests that the "vaulting high-energy fugue theme is the perfect illustration of the heroic struggle".

The bass recitative in E minor describes the importance of the victory over Satan, but exudes a sombre mood, suggesting the continued difficulties of mankind.

The third movement is a soprano aria with obbligato oboes, "an oasis of protective tranquillity" in the major mode. However, elements of the music disturb the peace conveyed by the text: the extended ritornello begins with an "odd three-bar phrasing", leading into a passage of constant momentum between the two oboes.

The tenor recitative is again in the minor mode, this time to describe the fragility of man. This movement moves into a striking tenor aria, describing a personal response to the text. The aria is the longest movement of the cantata, representing a third of the total length of the work. The trumpet plays the full chorale melody of "Herzlich lieb hab ich dich, o Herr", probably with the third stanza mentioning angels in mind, over a siciliano rhythm in the strings and continuo.

The penultimate movement is a brief secco soprano recitative that returns to the major mode to prepare the closing chorale. The chorale has the feel of a minuet, although there is some tension because of the changing phrase lengths employed by the melody.

Publication 
The text is a reworked version of a libretto which Picander published in 1725.

As with almost all Bach's cantatas, the music did not appear in print until the 19th century, although the cantata was revived several times in Hamburg by Bach's son Carl Philipp Emanuel. It was first published in 1852 in the Bach-Gesellschaft Ausgabe (BGA), edited by Moritz Hauptmann

Recordings 
 Concentus musicus Wien, Nikolaus Harnoncourt. J. S. Bach: Complete Cantatas Vol. 06. Teldec.
 Amsterdam Baroque Orchestra & Choir, Ton Koopman. J. S. Bach: Complete Cantatas Vol. 17. Antoine Marchand, 2003.
 Berliner Motettenchor / Berliner Philharmoniker, Fritz Lehmann. J. S. Bach: Cantatas BWV 1 & BWV 19. American Decca / Deutsche Grammophon, 1952.
 Gächinger Kantorei / Bach-Collegium Stuttgart, Helmuth Rilling. Die Bach Kantate Vol. 18. Hänssler, 1971.
 Heinrich-Schütz-Chor Heilbronn / Pforzheim Chamber Orchestra, Fritz Werner. Bach Cantatas: Volume 2. Erato, 1964.
 Holland Boys Choir / Netherlands Bach Collegium, Pieter Jan Leusink. Bach Edition Vol. 21 – Cantatas Vol. 12. Brilliant Classics, 2000.
 Monteverdi Choir / English Baroque Soloists, John Eliot Gardiner. Bach Cantatas Vol. 7: Ambronay/Bremen. Soli Deo Gloria 2000.
 Stuttgart Choral Society / Bach-Orchester Stuttgart, Hans Grischkat. J. S. Bach: Cantatas BWV 6 & BWV 19. Renaissance, 1951.
 Bach Collegium Japan, Masaaki Suzuki. J.S. Bach: Cantatas Vol. 46, BIS, 2009

References

Sources 
  Es erhub sich ein Streit BWV 19; BC A 180 / Sacred cantata (Michaelmas [29 September]) Bach Digital
 BWV 19 – "Es erhub sich ein Streit": English translation, discussion, Emmanuel Music
 BWV 19 Es erhub sich ein Streit: text, scoring, University of Alberta

External links
 
 Luke Dahn: BWV 19.7 bach-chorales.com
 Cantata BWV 19 Es erhub sich ein Streit: history, scoring, sources for text and music, translations to various languages, discography, discussion, Bach Cantatas Website

1726 compositions
Church cantatas by Johann Sebastian Bach